is a Japanese noodle dish. It consists of  served in a broth; common flavors are soy sauce and miso, with typical toppings including , nori (dried seaweed), menma (bamboo shoots), and scallions. Ramen has its roots in Chinese noodle dishes. Nearly every region in Japan has its own variation of ramen, such as the tonkotsu (pork bone broth) ramen of Kyushu and the miso ramen of Hokkaido.

History

Etymology
The word ramen is a Japanese borrowing of the Mandarin Chinese lāmiàn ('pulled noodles'). However, historian Barak Kushner argues that this borrowing occurred retroactively and that various independent Japanese corruptions of Chinese words had already led to Japanese people calling this Chinese noodle dish "ramen". The Japanese then appended the word  (meaning 'noodle') to the "ra" to create the word ramen. Until the 1950s, ramen was most commonly called , but today  or just  are more common, as the word  (meaning 'China') has acquired a pejorative connotation through its association with Japanese imperialism.

Origin
Ramen is a Japanese adaptation of Chinese wheat noodle soups. It is first recorded to have appeared in Yokohama Chinatown in the early 20th century. Although the ramen takes its name from lāmiàn, it does not actually evolve from the northern Chinese dish of lamian. The ramen is derived from southern Chinese noodle dishes such as the char siu tangmian of Guangdong and the rousi tangmian of Jiangnan. This is reflective of Yokohama Chinatown's demographics, as most Chinese settlers in the district came from the cities of Guangzhou and Shanghai.  

One theory says that ramen was introduced to Japan during the 1660s by the Chinese neo-Confucian scholar Zhu Shunsui who served as an advisor to Tokugawa Mitsukuni after he became a refugee in Japan to escape Manchu rule and Mitsukuni became the first Japanese person to eat ramen. Most historians reject this theory as a myth created by the Japanese to embellish the origins of ramen. 

According to historians, the more plausible theory is that ramen was introduced to Japan in the late 19th or early 20th centuries by Chinese immigrants living in Yokohama Chinatown. By 1900, restaurants serving Chinese cuisine from Guangzhou and Shanghai offered a simple dish of noodles, a few toppings, and a broth flavored with salt and pork bones. Many Chinese living in Japan also pulled portable food stalls, selling ramen and gyōza dumplings to workers. By the mid-1900s, these stalls used a type of a musical horn called a charumera (from the Portuguese ) to advertise their presence, a practice some vendors still retain via a loudspeaker and a looped recording. By the early Shōwa period, ramen had become a popular dish when eating out. 

According to ramen expert Hiroshi Osaki, the first specialized ramen shop opened in 1910, in Asakusa, Tokyo, and was named . The Japanese owner employed twelve Cantonese cooks from Yokohama's Chinatown and served the ramen arranged for Japanese customers. Early versions were wheat noodles in broth topped with char siu.

Postwar popularization

After Japan's defeat in World War II, the American military occupied the country from 1945 to 1952. In December 1945, Japan recorded its worst rice harvest in 42 years, which caused food shortages as Japan had drastically reduced rice production during the war as production shifted to colonies in China and Formosa island. The US flooded the market with cheap wheat flour to deal with food shortages. From 1948 to 1951, bread consumption in Japan increased from 262,121 tons to 611,784 tons, but wheat also found its way into ramen, which most Japanese ate at black market food vendors to survive as the government food distribution system ran about 20 days behind schedule. Although the Americans maintained Japan's wartime ban on outdoor food vending, flour was secretly diverted from commercial mills into the black markets, where nearly 90 percent of stalls were under the control of gangsters related to the yakuza who extorted vendors for protection money. Thousands of ramen vendors were arrested during the occupation. 

In the same period, millions of Japanese troops returned from China and continental East Asia from their posts in the Second Sino-Japanese War. Some of them would have been familiar with wheat noodles. By 1950 wheat flour exchange controls were removed and restrictions on food vending loosened, which further boosted the number of ramen vendors: private companies even rented out yatai starter kits consisting of noodles, toppings, bowls, and chopsticks. Ramen  provided a rare opportunity for small-scale postwar entrepreneurship. The Americans also aggressively advertised the nutritional benefits of wheat and animal protein. The combination of these factors caused wheat noodles to gain prominence in Japan's rice-based culture. Gradually, ramen became associated with urban life.

Modern period

In 1958, instant noodles were invented by Momofuku Ando, the Taiwanese-Japanese founder and chairman of Nissin Foods. Named the greatest Japanese invention of the 20th century in a Japanese poll, instant ramen allowed anyone to make an approximation of this dish simply by adding boiling water.

Beginning in the 1980s, ramen became a Japanese cultural icon and was studied around the world. At the same time, local varieties of ramen were hitting the national market and could even be ordered by their regional names. A ramen museum opened in Yokohama in 1994.

Today ramen is one of Japan's most popular foods, with Tokyo alone containing around 5,000 ramen shops, and more than 24,000 ramen shops across Japan. Tsuta, a ramen restaurant in Tokyo's Sugamo district, received a Michelin star in December 2015.

Types
A wide variety of ramen exists in Japan, with geographical and vendor-specific differences even in varieties that share the same name. Although ramen usually has toppings, ramen can be broadly categorized by its two main ingredients: noodles and broth.

Noodles

Although ramen noodles and Udon noodles are both made with wheat and are similar, they are different kinds of noodle.

The  is the distinguishing ingredient in ramen noodles, and originated in Inner Mongolia, where some lakes contain large amounts of these minerals and whose water is said to be perfect for making these noodles. Making noodles with  lends them a yellowish hue as well as a firm texture. Some noodles are made with neither eggs nor  and should only be used for yakisoba, as they have a weaker structure and are more prone to soaking up moisture and becoming extremely soft when served in soup.

Ramen comes in various shapes and lengths. It may be thick, thin, or even ribbon-like, as well as straight or wrinkled.

Traditionally, ramen noodles were made by hand, but with growing popularity many ramen restaurants prefer to use noodle-making machines to meet the increased demand and improve quality. Automatic ramen-making machines imitating manual production methods have been available since the mid-20th century produced by such Japanese manufacturers as Yamato MFG. and others.

Soup

Ramen soup is generally made from stock based on chicken or pork, combined with a variety of ingredients such as pork bones, katsuobushi (skipjack tuna flakes), niboshi (dried baby sardines), beef bones, shiitake, onions, and kombu (kelp). Some modern ramen broths can also be vegetable-based. Tare is often added to broth to make the soup.
 ('pork bone'; not to be confused with tonkatsu) soup is broth with a typically translucent white colored appearance. Similar to the Chinese baitang, it has a thick broth made from boiling pork bones, fat, and collagen over high heat for many hours, which suffuses the broth with a hearty pork flavor and a creamy consistency that rivals milk, melted butter or gravy (depending on the shop). Although  is merely a kind of broth, some people consider tonkotsu ramen (specialty of Kyushu, its birthplace) a distinct flavor category. 
 ('chicken bone') soup based on chicken bone broth originated mainly in Tokyo. It is often used as a base for salt and  ramen.

Flavors

The resulting combination is generally divided into several categories. Although newer and older variations often make this categorization less clear-cut, a description of said old variations is as follows:
  ('salt') ramen is the oldest of the four types. It has a pale, clear, yellowish broth made with plenty of salt and any combination of chicken, vegetables, fish, and seaweed. Occasionally pork bones are also used, but they are not boiled as long as they are for  ramen, so the soup remains light and clear. Chāshū is sometimes swapped for lean chicken meatballs, and pickled plums and kamaboko (a slice of processed fish roll sometimes served as a frilly white circle with a pink or red spiral called narutomaki) are popular toppings as well. Noodle texture and thickness varies among  ramen, but they are usually straight rather than curly. Hakodate ramen is a well-known version of  ramen in Japan.
 ('soy sauce') ramen has a clear brown broth, based on a chicken and vegetable (or sometimes fish or beef) stock with plenty of soy sauce added resulting in a soup that is tangy, salty, and savory yet still fairly light on the palate.  ramen usually has curly noodles rather than straight ones, although this is not always the case. It is often adorned with marinated bamboo shoots or menma, scallions,  ('carrot'),  ('fish cakes'),  ('seaweed'), boiled eggs, bean sprouts or black pepper; occasionally the soup will also contain chili oil or Chinese spices, and some shops serve sliced beef instead of the usual chāshū.
 ramen reached national prominence around 1965. The noodles are typically thick, curly, and slightly chewy.
 ('curry') ramen is a relative newcomer, cooked with curry soup. In Japan, several cities claim to be its place of origin. The city of Muroran claims it originated there in 1965 (see also Muroran curry ramen), while the city of Sanjō claims to have had  ramen for over 80 years, and the city of Katori also claims to have been the site of its origin. Curry soup is mainly made with pork bones and vegetables and is seasoned with curry. The noodles are thick and curly. Toppings include chāshū, wakame, and bean sprouts.

Toppings

After basic preparation, ramen can be seasoned and flavored with any number of toppings, including but not limited to:
 Chāshū (sliced barbecued or braised pork)
 Negi (green onion)
  (Pickled and seasoned mustard leaves)
 Seasoned (usually salted) boiled egg (soy egg)
 Bean or other sprouts
 Menma (lactate-fermented bamboo shoots)
 Kakuni (braised pork cubes or squares)
  (wood ear mushroom)
 Nori (dried seaweed)
 Kamaboko (formed fish paste, often in a pink and white spiral called narutomaki)
 Squid
 Umeboshi (pickled plum)
 Corn
 Butter
 Wakame (a type of seaweed)
 Olive oil
 Sesame oil
 Soy sauce
 Other types of vegetables

Preference
Seasonings commonly added to ramen are white pepper, black pepper, butter, chili pepper, sesame seeds, and crushed garlic. Soup recipes and methods of preparation tend to be closely guarded secrets.

Regional variations
While standard versions of ramen are available throughout Japan since the Taishō period, the last few decades have shown a proliferation of regional variations, commonly referred to as  ramen. Some of these which have gone on to national prominence are:

 Sapporo, the capital of Hokkaido, is especially famous for its ramen. Most people in Japan associate Sapporo with its rich  ramen, which was invented there and which is ideal for Hokkaido's harsh, snowy winters. Sapporo  ramen is typically topped with sweetcorn, butter, bean sprouts, finely chopped pork, and garlic, and sometimes local seafood such as scallop, squid, and crab. Hakodate, another city of Hokkaido, is famous for its salt-flavored ramen, while Asahikawa in the north of the island offers a soy sauce-flavored variation. In Muroran, many ramen restaurants offer Muroran curry ramen.

 Kitakata ramen is known for its rather thick, flat, curly noodles served in a pork-and-niboshi broth. The area within the former city limits has the highest per-capita number of ramen establishments.

 Tokyo-style ramen consists of slightly thin, curly noodles served in a soy-flavored chicken broth. The Tokyo-style broth typically has a touch of dashi, as old ramen establishments in Tokyo often originate from soba eateries. Standard toppings are chopped scallion, menma, sliced pork, kamaboko, egg, nori, and spinach. Ikebukuro, Ogikubo and Ebisu are three areas in Tokyo known for their ramen.

 Yokohama ramen specialty is called Ie-kei. The standard toppings are roasted pork (chāshū), boiled spinach, sheets of nori, often with shredded Welsh onion and a soft- or hard-boiled egg. It is traditional for customers to customize the softness of the noodles, the richness of the broth and the amount of oil they want.

 Wakayama ramen in the Kansai region has a broth made from soy sauce and pork bones.

 Hakata ramen originates from Hakata district of Fukuoka city in Kyushu. It has a rich, milky, pork-bone  broth and rather thin, non-curly and resilient noodles. Often, distinctive toppings such as crushed garlic, beni shōga (pickled ginger), sesame seeds, and spicy pickled mustard greens are left on tables for customers to serve themselves. Ramen stalls in Hakata and Tenjin are well known within Japan. Recent trends have made Hakataramen one of the most popular types in Japan, and several chain restaurants specializing in Hakata ramen can be found all over the country.
Tofu ramen is a specialty of Iwatsuki ward in Saitama City.

Related dishes
There are many related, Chinese-influenced noodle dishes in Japan. The following are often served alongside ramen in ramen establishments. They do not include noodle dishes considered traditionally Japanese, such as soba or udon, which are almost never served in the same establishments as ramen.
 Nagasaki champon. The noodles are thicker than ramen but thinner than udon.  is topped with a variety of ingredients, mostly seafood, stir-fried and dressed in a starchy sauce. The stir-fried ingredients are poured directly over the cooked noodles, with the sauce acting as a soup.
  is a mild, usually salty soup, served with a mix of sautéed vegetables and seafood/pork.
  has long, straight noodles and wonton, served in a mild, usually salty soup.
 Tsukemen ('dipping noodles'). The noodles and soup are served in separate bowls. The diner dips the noodles in the soup before eating. Can be served hot or chilled.

 . Japanese version of dan dan noodles, itself a Sichuan specialty. Ramen in a reddish, spicy chili and sesame soup, usually containing minced pork, garnished with chopped scallion and chili and occasionally topped with spinach or bok choi.
The topping ingredients are sautéed and a thickener is added before the mix is poured on the soup and the noodles.
  ('oil-noodles'). Ramen and toppings served without the soup, but with a small quantity of oily soy-based sauce instead.
 Hiyashi-chūka ('chilled Chinese'). A summer dish of chilled ramen on a plate with various toppings (typically thin strips of omelet, ham, cucumber and tomato) and served with a vinegary soy dressing and karashi (Japanese mustard). It was first produced at the Ryutei, a Chinese restaurant in Sendai.

Restaurants in Japan

Ramen is offered in various types of restaurants and locations including ramen shops, izakaya drinking establishments, lunch cafeterias, karaoke halls, and amusement parks. Many ramen restaurants only have a counter and a chef. In these shops, the meals are paid for in advance at a ticket machine to streamline the process.

However, the best quality ramen is usually only available in specialist  restaurants. Some restaurants also provide Halal ramen (using chicken) in Osaka and Kyoto. As  restaurants offer mainly ramen dishes, they tend to lack variety in the menu. Besides ramen, some of the dishes generally available in a  restaurant include other dishes from Japanese Chinese cuisine such as fried rice (called  or ), gyoza (Chinese dumplings), and beer.  interiors are often filled with Chinese-inspired decorations.

During the COVID-19 pandemic, many ramen restaurants were temporarily closed, with 34 chains filing for bankruptcy by September 2020. Ramen restaurants are typically narrow and seat customers closely, making social distancing difficult.

Outside Japan
Restaurant chains serve ramen alongside distinctly Japanese dishes, such as tempura and yakitori. Interestingly, in Japan, these dishes are not traditionally served with ramen, but gyoza, kara-age and others from Japanese Chinese cuisine.

In Korea, ramen is called ramyeon. There are different varieties, such as kimchi-flavored . While usually served with egg or vegetables such as carrots and scallions, some restaurants serve variations of  containing additional ingredients such as dumplings, tteok, or cheese as toppings.

Outside of Asia, particularly in areas with a large demand for Asian cuisine, there are restaurants specializing in Japanese-style foods such as ramen noodles. For example, Wagamama, a UK-based restaurant chain serving pan-Asian food, serves a ramen noodle soup and in the United States and Canada, Jinya Ramen Bar serves  ramen.

Instant ramen

Instant ramen noodles were exported from Japan by Nissin Foods starting in 1971, bearing the name "Oodles of Noodles". One year later, it was re-branded "Nissin Cup Noodles", packaged in a foam food container (It is referred to as Cup Ramen in Japan), and subsequently saw a growth in international sales. Over time, the term ramen became used in North America to refer to other instant noodles. While some research has claimed that consuming instant ramen two or more times a week increases the likelihood of developing heart disease and other conditions, including diabetes and stroke, especially in women, those claims have not been reproduced and no study has isolated instant ramen consumption as an aggravating factor. However, instant ramen noodles, known to have a serving of 43 g, consist of very high sodium.  At least 1,760 mg of sodium are found in one packet alone. It consists of 385k calories, 55.7 g of carbohydrates, 14.5 g of total fat, 6.5 g of saturated fat, 7.9 g of protein, and 0.6 mg of thiamine.

Canned version
It is intended as a quick snack, and includes a small folded plastic fork.

In popular culture

Emoji
In October 2010, an emoji was approved for Unicode 6.0  for "Steaming Bowl", that depicts Japanese ramen noodles in a bowl of steaming broth with chopsticks. In 2015, the icon was added to Emoji 1.0.

Museum
The Shin-Yokohama Rāmen Museum is a unique museum about ramen, in the Shin-Yokohama district of Kōhoku-ku, Yokohama.

Anime
Ramen features prominently in many Japanese anime, including Naruto, Kaguya-sama: Love is War, Komi Can't Communicate, and Food Wars!: Shokugeki no Soma.

See also

 List of Japanese soups and stews
 List of noodle dishes
 List of ramen dishes
 List of soups
 Laghman
 Lo mein
 Pot Noodle
 Hawaiian saimin
 Shirataki noodles
 Tare sauce
 Laksa (Southeast Asia)
Beef noodles

References

Further reading 
 
  Interview with the author.
 How to Customize your Ramen - Toppings and Japanese Vocabulary

 
Chinese inventions
Japanese cuisine terms
Japanese inventions
Japanese noodle dishes
Japanese soups and stews
Japanese Chinese cuisine
National dishes
Noodle soups